Willowridge High School is a public high school in Houston, Texas, United States and part of the Fort Bend Independent School District. Willowridge serves grades 9 through 12.

The school serves many areas of northeast Fort Bend County east and north of FM 2234, and a section of Houston inside Fort Bend County, including the neighborhoods of Briargate, Chasewood, Willow Park II, Mayfair Park, Ridgemont, Ridgegate, and Briar Villa. The school also serves the Fort Bend County portion of Shadow Creek Ranch, a community within the city of Pearland .

This school is well known for its marching band, known as the "Mighty Eagle Marching Band." Under band directors Mr. Ronald Thornton (head), Delcenia Hill, Maurice Ross, Robert Lee, and Robert Jackson, the band performed at the Rose Bowl in 1994 and Orange Bowl in 1996. In 2001, the band participated in the Macy's Thanksgiving Day Parade and in the summer of 2005, the Willowridge Band vacationed in Honolulu, Hawaii, a rarity for high school bands. The band also hosted the Bands of America contest at Rice Stadium on October 1, 2005. They have consecutively won 1st place at the MLK Battle Of The Bands and All-American Battle Of The Bands.

The school is also renowned for its basketball program. In 2001, the men's team accomplished the rare feat of having two McDonald's All-Americans in Daniel Ewing and T. J. Ford, who went on to play for Duke University and Texas, respectively.

History
The first phase of Willowridge started in February 1978 and was occupied in September 1979. Willowridge was the second (racially integrated) high school opened in FBISD.

In the 1980s, the school was known for its successful football program. During the 82-83 season, NFL Hall of Famer Thurman Thomas led the football team to the Texas Class 4A state Championship. This era also produced other NFL players such as O. J. Brigance, Charles Arbuckle, Allen Aldridge, Selwyn Jones and Stanley Petry.

From 1999 to 2001, the men's basketball team compiled a 75–1 win–loss record (including a 62-game winning streak) earning a pair of Texas Class 5A state titles.

One of the streets on the WHS campus was named in memory of former principal Edgar Glover, Jr.  Glover, who served as principal between November 1982 until his death in April 1993.  Coincidentally, an elementary school named in Edgar Glover, Jr's honor opened on August 17, 1994 [(Opened fall 1992 )].

The second phase of Willowridge High School was completed in summer 1992 and dedicated on September 23, 1992 [(Opened fall 1992 )].  During the expansion, the Ronald McNair Auditorium was dedicated in memoriam (the middle school next to Willowridge was named after Christa McAuliffe).

In 2017 the school temporarily closed due to a mold contamination.

Campus
Circa 2018 Jay Shells, a New York City graphic designer, installed a sign referring to a Z-Ro rap song which talks about the school at the school entrance. The sign was made as a dedication to Houston rap culture.

Feeder patterns
The following elementary schools feed into Willowridge:
 Briargate
 Ridgegate
 Ridgemont
 Blue Ridge

The following middle schools feed into Willowridge:
 McAuliffe

Notable alumni

Allen Aldridge - Former NFL Football Player for the Denver Broncos. (Class of 1990)
Charles Arbuckle - Former NFL Football Player for the Indianapolis Colts. (Class of 1986)
O.J. Brigance - Former NFL Football Player Baltimore Ravens and current director of player development; also founder of the Brigance Brigade. Recipient of the 2012 Distinguished Alumni Award from Rice University.  (Class of 1987)
Eric England - Former NFL football player and current player for the Toronto Argonauts in the CFL. (Class of 1990)
Daniel Ewing - Former NBA Basketball Player for the Los Angeles Clippers, now player for Maccabi Ashdod of the Israeli Premier League. (Class of 2001)
T. J. Ford - Former NBA Basketball Player for the San Antonio Spurs. (Class of 2001)
Selwyn Jones - Former NFL defensive back for the Seattle Seahawks and Super Bowl champion Denver Broncos in 1998. Won championship with high school teammate Allen Aldridge. (Class of 1988).
Albert Johnson III - Former NFL & CFL football player for Winnipeg Blue Bombers & Miami Dolphins
Brad Terrence Jordan - Houston rapper also known as Scarface. (Attended)
Ivan McFarlin - Former NBA basketball player for the Philadelphia 76ers. (Class of 2000)
Manny Ramirez - Current offensive lineman for the Denver Broncos. (Class of 2002)
Di Reed - Member of early 1990s R&B Soul Group, Jade.
Ansu Sesay - Former NBA Basketball player for the Seattle SuperSonics, and Golden State Warriors. (Class of 1994)
Thurman Thomas - Former NFL Running Back for the Buffalo Bills. Elected to the Pro Football Hall of Fame in 2007 and into the College Football Hall of Fame in 2008. (Class of 1984)
Isaiah Washington - Actor mostly known for his roles in Romeo Must Die, Wild Things 2, Grey's Anatomy. (Class of 1981)
Jason Webster - Former NFL football player for the New England Patriots and Atlanta Falcons. (Class of 1996)
Z-Ro - Member of Houston rap group ABN.

References

External links

 Willowridge High School
 Go Mighty Eagles! Willowridge High School Alumni Network
 WHS Class of 1990 Reunion/Alumni Network

Educational institutions established in 1979
Fort Bend Independent School District high schools
Public high schools in Houston
1979 establishments in Texas